J2 was a New Zealand jukebox television channel that featured music targeted at an older audience. It played music spanning many decades and genres and was aimed at capturing audiences that would be put off by the programming on other music channels such as C4, its parent Juice TV and  MTV. It was owned and operated by Juice TV and was carried on the SKY Television network from 2001 until 2014.

On May 1, 2008 it was re-branded from J2 to 63 - Our Music TV. On May 1, 2013, it reverted to the original name J2 due to its number being reassigned to Sky sporting channels. The channel stopped broadcasting on Sky TV from November 11, 2014.

References

Music video networks in New Zealand
Television channels and stations established in 2001
2001 establishments in New Zealand
Television channels and stations disestablished in 2014
2014 disestablishments in New Zealand